Elophila minimalis is a species of moth of the family Crambidae. It was described by Max Saalmüller in 1880 and is found in Madagascar.

It has a wingspan of 7 mm.

References

Acentropinae
Moths described in 1880
Moths of Madagascar
Moths of Africa